Boris Mikhailovich (Russian: Борис Михайлович) is, controversially, considered to have been Prince of Moscow from 1248 to 1263, preceding Daniil Aleksandrovich, who is more often named as the first Prince of Moscow.

Boris was the son of Mikhail Yaroslavich Khorobrit, who was the younger brother of Aleksandr Nevsky, and would thus have been Daniil's uncle.  Boris' father was briefly Grand Prince of Vladimir in 1248, but Boris never seems to have held that title.   Following Boris' death, Daniil took control of Moscow only in about 1283.

See also
 Bibliography of Russian history (1223–1613)
Rulers of Russia family tree

References

13th-century Grand Princes of Moscow
Grand Princes of Moscow
Rurik dynasty
Yurievichi family
13th-century princes in Kievan Rus'
Eastern Orthodox monarchs

ru:Михаил Ярославич Хоробрит#Семья